Wallacia may refer to:

 Wallacia, a trilobite genus, see Encrinuridae
 Wallacia, New South Wales

See also 
 Wallacea, a group of islands mainly in Indonesia
 Wallachia, a former principality and region of Romania